Bear Creek is the name of a stream located entirely within  Jackson County, Oregon. It begins near Emigrant Lake and travels  through the municipalities of Ashland, Talent, Phoenix, Medford, and Central Point.

History 
Prior to the arrival of settlers in the 1850s, the Bear Creek Valley was home to three Native American tribes; these were the Takelmas, the Latgawas, and the Shastas.  The scattered camps hunted deer and elk, fished for salmon, and consumed plums, sunflowers, and root crops.  When the area was originally settled, the stream was called Si-ku-ptat by the natives and may have been known as Stewart River by settlers.

Various forced migrations occurred during the 1850s in which almost all of the Native American inhabitants were displaced to Indian Reservations by 1857.  Farmers and ranchers continued to acquire land claims, and when the Oregon and California Railroad arrived in 1883, Bear Creek was chosen as the route to follow.

Geology 
The confluence with the Rogue River is in the northwestern tip of the valley. From there at least 83 streams in 21 sub-watersheds share a link with the greater Rogue River Basin.

The landscape surrounding the watershed has been carved by tectonic activity leaving steep canyons that are prone to flooding when snow melts in the spring. The slopes are part of the transition zone between volcanic soil and granitic soil covering much of Southern Oregon and Northern California and are prone to significant periods of erosion and runoff during high-flow periods. Historically, the landscape plays a large part in dispersing this energy but flooding has become a regular problem along the Bear Creek; several earlier bridges in the Rogue Valley have been wiped out during random flood events.

See also 
Bear Creek Greenway

Notes

References

External links

Map of the Bear Creek Watershed

Rivers of Oregon
Rogue River (Oregon)
Rivers of Jackson County, Oregon